Teshan may refer to:

Teshan (monk) (780-865), Chinese zen monk 
Teshan (film), 2016 Indian Punjabi-language romantic comedy film